Streptomyces salilacus is a bacterium species from the genus of Streptomyces which has been isolated from the Xiaoerkule Lake from Xinjiang in China.

See also 
 List of Streptomyces species

References 

salilacus
Bacteria described in 2018